Eswatini is a sovereign state in Southern Africa. Eswatini is a developing country with a small economy. Its GDP per capita of $9,714 means it is classified as a country with a lower-middle income. As a member of the Southern African Customs Union (SACU) and Common Market for Eastern and Southern Africa (COMESA), its main local trading partner is South Africa.  Eswatini's currency, the lilangeni, is pegged to the South African rand.  Eswatini's major overseas trading partners are the United States and the European Union. The majority of the country's employment is provided by its agricultural and manufacturing sectors. Eswatini is a member of the Southern African Development Community (SADC), the African Union, the Commonwealth of Nations and the United Nations.

Notable firms 
This list includes notable companies with primary headquarters located in the country. The industry and sector follow the Industry Classification Benchmark taxonomy. Organizations which have ceased operations are included and noted as defunct.

See also
 List of banks in Eswatini
 List of airlines of Eswatini

References

 
Companies of Eswatini
Eswatini